Anarjan may refer to:
 Anarjan, Bostanabad
 Anarjan, Tabriz